Joseph Osei-Owusu (born 22 January 1962, in Bekwai) is a Ghanaian lawyer, and politician. He is the first deputy speaker of the 8th Parliament of the 4th Republic and also the Member of Parliament for the Bekwai constituency in the Ghanaian Parliament.

Early life and education 
Osei-Owusu was born on 22 January 1962 had his basic education in his hometown, Bekwai. He had his O-level secondary school education at Juaben Secondary School in Juaben in the Ashanti Region in 1981. In 1983, he also had his A-level in Wenchi Secondary School. He then went on to have a Bachelor of Arts (BA) Classics and Law from the University of Ghana in 1987, a Barrister of Law (BL) from the Ghana School of Law in 1989 and an Executive master's degree in Governance and Leadership from the Ghana Institute of Management and Public Administration (GIMPA) in 2007.

Career 
Osei-Owusu has worked as a lawyer for 29 years in Ghana after being called to the bar in 1990. He started his career in the chambers of Yaw Barimah & Co and later joined George Sarpong Legal Services where he later rose to become Assistant Head of Chambers. He later became chief executive officer (CEO) of the Driver and Vehicle Licensing Authority (DVLA) a political appointment he got during the tenure of John Agyekum Kufour.

First Deputy Speaker 
He was elected the First Deputy Speaker of the 7th Parliament of the 4th Republic and re-elected to that position for the 8th Parliament. He first became an MP in 2009, after being elected with 86.06% of the total valid votes cast.

Committees 
He is currently the chairperson for Privileges Committee and also the Appointments Committee in parliament. He is also a member of Standing Orders Committee and the Roads and Transport Committee.

Personal life 
Osei-Owusu is a Christian.

References 

Ghanaian chief executives
University of Ghana alumni
Living people
1962 births
Ghanaian business executives
Ghana Institute of Management and Public Administration alumni
20th-century Ghanaian lawyers
Ghanaian MPs 2009–2013
Ghanaian MPs 2013–2017
Ghanaian MPs 2017–2021
Ghanaian MPs 2021–2025
21st-century Ghanaian lawyers